Acanthodactylus orientalis  is a species of lizard in the family Lacertidae. The species is endemic to Western Asia.

Geographic range
A. orientalis is found in Iraq, Saudi Arabia, and Syria.

Reproduction
A. orientalis is oviparous.

References

Further reading
Angel F (1936). "Reptiles et batraciens de Syrie et de Mésopotamie récoltés par M.P. Pallary ". Bulletin de l'Institut d'Égypte 18: 107–116. (Acanthodactylus tristrami orientalis, new subspecies, p. 109). (in French).
Leviton, Alan E.; Anderson, Steven C.; Adler, Kraig; Minton, Sherman A. (1992). Handbook to Middle East Amphibians and Reptiles. (Contributions to Herpetology No. 8). Oxford, Ohio: Society for the Study of Amphibians and Reptiles (SSAR). 252 pp. .
Sindaco, Roberto; Jeremčenko, Valery K. (2008). The Reptiles of the Western Palearctic: 1. Annotated Checklist and Distributional Atlas of the Turtles, Crocodiles, Amphisbaenians and Lizards of Europe, North Africa, Middle East and Central Asia. (Monographs of the Societas Herpetologica Italica). Latina, Italy: Edizioni Belvedere. 580 pp. .

Acanthodactylus
Reptiles described in 1936
Taxa named by Fernand Angel